Rachitha Mahalakshmi is an Indian television actress who predominantly work in Tamil along with some Telugu, and Kannada television with few films. She is best known for her role as Jyoti in Pirivom Sandhipom But she critically acclaimed as Meenatchi in the popular Tamil series Saravanan Meenatchi She also was a contestant on the reality show Bigg Boss Tamil - Season 6 and later got evicted from the show on day 91.

Early life and career 
Rachitha was born in Bangalore. Rachitha is fluent in Tamil, Kannada, Telugu, Hindi, Malayalam and English. She is married to Dinesh Gopalasamy from Srivilliputhur who acted as her pair in the serial Pirivom Santhipom. Rachitha made her debut in Mega Mandala, which was telecasted in Star Suvarna. Rachitha became popular and successful after playing the lead role, as Meenatchi, in Saravanan Meenatchi, which aired in Star Vijay. Since then, she is also recognized as Meenatchi.

Television

Filmography

References

External links
 

Living people
Indian television actresses
Indian film actresses
Actresses from Bangalore
21st-century Indian actresses
Bigg Boss (Tamil TV series) contestants
Actresses in Malayalam television
Actresses in Tamil television
Actresses in Telugu television
Actresses in Kannada television
Actresses in Kannada cinema
Actresses in Tamil cinema
Year of birth missing (living people)